Abyek County is in Qazvin province, Iran. The capital of the county is the city of Abyek. At the 2006 census, the county's population was 89,334 in 23,132 households. The following census in 2011 counted 93,844 people in 26,944 households. At the 2016 census, the county's population was 94,536 in 29,234 households. The majority of Abyek County are Azerbaijani turks.

Administrative divisions

The population history of Abyek County's administrative divisions over three consecutive censuses is shown in the following table. The latest census shows two districts, five rural districts, and two cities.

References

 

Counties of Qazvin Province